The word Nati is used for the traditional folk songs sung in the Western and Central Hills of the Indian subcontinent. It  is primarily native to the states of Himachal Pradesh and Uttarakhand. Nati  is traditionally performed in the  Kullu, Mandi,  Shimla, Sirmaur, Chamba, Kinnaur, Uttarkashi, Dehradun (Jaunsar-Bawar) and Tehri Garhwal districts. However, due to high immigration of ethnic paharis in the plains, this has been made popular in the plains too. Nowadays many consider pahari dance as nati but it actually corresponds to pahari songs. Traditionally, locals dance to the beats of percussion instruments called Dhol-Damau. Pahari dance is listed in the Guinness Book of World Records as largest folk dance.

Varieties
There are several varieties of Nati performed like  Kullvi Nati, Mahasuvi Nati, Sirmauri Nati, Kinnauri Nati, Jaunpuri Nati, Seraji Nati, Karsogi Nati ,Chuhari Nati, Barada Nati, Bangani Nati. In Garhwali it is also sometimes called Tandi, specially in Tehri Garhwal, and Barada Nati in Jaunsar-Bawar. People of Lahaul district have their own distinct dance called "Garphi" and Nati is not a part of Lahauli culture. The Kinnauri Nati dance is mime-like and includes languid sequences. Important among the dances of Nati is 'Losar shone chuksom'. The name from Losai, or the New Year. Activities such as sowing the crop and reaping it are included in it.

Records
The Nati Dance in the second week of January 2016 was listed in the Guinness Book of World Records as the largest folk dance in the world. Nati entered in the book as the largest folk dance in terms of participants’ number. Total 9892 women participated in this folk dance in
their traditional colourful Kullvi dress on 26 October 2015 during International Dussehra festival.

References

Dances of India
Culture of Himachal Pradesh